Timba Timba Island is an island located near Semporna in Sabah, Malaysia.

See also
 List of islands of Malaysia

References

External links 
 Timba Timba Island
 Pulau Timba Timba on geoview.info

Islands of Sabah